Building at 200–202A High Street is a historic store and dwelling located at Seaford, Sussex County, Delaware. It was built about 1910, and is a -story, seven bay, "L"-shaped brick structure.  The front section has a gable roof and the rear section a hipped roof.  It is typical of the stores with attached dwellings that were located along High Street.

It was added to the National Register of Historic Places in 1987.

References

Commercial buildings on the National Register of Historic Places in Delaware
Commercial buildings completed in 1910
Buildings and structures in Sussex County, Delaware
Seaford, Delaware
National Register of Historic Places in Sussex County, Delaware